Don't Be Embarrassed is an Iranian film directed by Reza Maghsoudi, written by Maghsoudi and Afra Jurablou, and produced by Seyed Amir Parvin Hosseini in 2018.

Synopsis 
This movie narrates the life story of a couple who, already having a son and a daughter-in-law, have a child in middle age. This happened in a small village where nothing is hidden from the neighbors. 

Qanbar (Ahmad Mehranfar) was thinking about the progress of the country and insisted that they have children. Sanam (Shabnam Moghaddami) gave birth to her child on the day her children and daughters-in-law came to her house. In order to hide the child from his other children, Qanbar tells them that someone had left the child behind the door of the house and he picked it up and brought it inside. While recreating the scene, he leaves the child behind the door and does not see the child when he opens the door. Qanbar and Sanam become anxious and go looking for the baby, and this makes the older children realize that the missing child is their sister. At the end of the story, the child is found by Heshmat (Sam Derakhshani), Sanam's brother.

References 

2010s Persian-language films
2018 films
Iranian comedy-drama films